Kerr Lake /kɑr/ (officially John H. Kerr Reservoir, also known as Bugg's Island Lake) is a reservoir along the border of the U.S. states of North Carolina and Virginia. It is impounded by the John H. Kerr Dam, constructed between 1947 and 1952 to produce hydroelectricity and to provide flood control. Kerr Lake is owned by the US Army Corps of Engineers, and is the largest reservoir in Virginia. It is located in parts of Vance, Granville, and Warren counties in North Carolina, and Mecklenburg, Charlotte, and Halifax counties in Virginia. The lake is named for Congressman John H. Kerr of North Carolina, who supported the original creation of the lake.

The lake is an impoundment of the Roanoke River (also called the Staunton River in Virginia). The Dan River and several smaller creeks also feed the lake. The lake is upstream of Lake Gaston. Just downstream from the John H. Kerr Dam, and visible from the viewing platform below the dam at Tailrace Park, lies Buggs Island, named for Samuel Bugg, an early settler.  North Carolinians know this body of water as Kerr Lake, while Virginians know it as Buggs Island Lake or Buggs Island Reservoir.

The large lake is widely popular with both North Carolinians and Virginians for fishing and recreational purposes.

Amenities
For fishing, the lake has an abundance of large-mouth bass, striped bass (the only certified lake in Virginia to have a naturally reproducing population), crappie, catfish and bluegill. Camping is also a popular activity, with many campsites (run by the Army Corps of Engineers, North Carolina State Parks and Virginia State Parks) lining the shore including Kimball Point, North Bend Park, County Line, Hibernia, and others.  Campsites for both tents and RVs are available. Jet-skiing and water-tubing occur often on the lake.  Recreational motor boating and sailing also occur on the lake, with four privately operated marinas available: Steele Creek and Satterwhite Point in North Carolina, along with Clarksville, and Rudds Creek in Virginia. These marinas have rental slips for sail and motor boats, with additional amenities including fuel docks, marina stores, and some organized yacht clubs. The Carolina Sailing Club stages monthly regattas for several one-design sailing classes from April through October.

See also
 Kerr Lake State Recreation Area

References

 https://www.ncparks.gov/kerr-lake-state-recreation-area/trails

External links

 Official Tourism Site (North Carolina)
 Official Tourism Site (Virginia)
 John H. Kerr Dam Project (US Army Corps of Engineers)
 Kerr Lake Fishing Information and Guides
 Vance County Department of Tourism - Kerr Lake

Reservoirs in Virginia
Reservoirs in North Carolina
Protected areas of Charlotte County, Virginia
Protected areas of Granville County, North Carolina
Protected areas of Halifax County, Virginia
Protected areas of Mecklenburg County, Virginia
Protected areas of Vance County, North Carolina
Protected areas of Warren County, North Carolina
Roanoke River
Rivers of Charlotte County, Virginia
Rivers of Granville County, North Carolina
Rivers of Halifax County, Virginia
Rivers of Mecklenburg County, Virginia
Rivers of Vance County, North Carolina
Rivers of Warren County, North Carolina